The NMBS/SNCB Type 12 was a class of  steam locomotives built in 1938–1939 for the fast lightweight Ostend boat trains operated by the National Railway Company of Belgium.

Design and construction

The class was designed by engineer Raoul Notesse, based on the Canadian Pacific Railway's successful 4-4-4 "Jubilee" semi-streamlined locomotives of 1936/7, but also incorporated the ideas on streamlining of André Huet.

The type 12 locomotives were produced for the Belgian Consortium of Locomotive Construction, by Société anonyme John Cockerill at Seraing, near Liège.

The locomotive bodies were fully streamlined except for openings to provide access to the valve gear and the crankshaft. The design included inside cylinders but outside valve gear to reduce oscillation at speed.

Operation
They were also used on Brussels–Liège expresses. During World War II they were used on Brussels–Ostend, Lontzen/Herbesthal, and Lille trains. For most of their careers, the type 12s were assigned to Schaerbeek, near Brussels.

The members of the class ended their careers on the Brussels–Mons and Brussels–Tournai services and were finally withdrawn 27 September 1962. No. 12.004 had been preserved by SNCB and was brought back to running order for the 150th anniversary of railways in Belgium in 1985 but was subsequently left exposed to the elements. Since September 2015 12.004 has been in the "Train World" railway museum at Schaerbeek, so this locomotive is back home.

In fiction
François Schuiten, the Belgian comic book author, made No. 12.004 the central theme of his Graphic novel La Douce, published in 2012.

In Thomas & Friends: The Great Race, a Belgian character named Axel was based on this locomotive.

See also

History of rail transport in Belgium
List of SNCB/NMBS classes
Rail transport in Belgium

References

Notes

Bibliography

External links 

Association Liègeoise des Amateurs de chemins de Fer (ALAF): Type 12 page 
SNCB-Holding> Railway heritage> Type 12 Atlantic 
François Schuiten La Douce website: history of no. 12.004

This article incorporates material from the French Wikipedia article Type 12 (SNCB)

4-4-2 locomotives
Cockerill locomotives
12
Railway locomotives introduced in 1938
Type 12
Passenger locomotives
Standard gauge locomotives of Belgium
2′B1′ h2 locomotives